TNN Radio is an American modern rock radio program that broadcasts from station KX935 in Laguna Beach, California. The station serves the Greater Orange County, Los Angeles, Riverside, and San Diego areas. The contemporary modern rock format is similar to that found at other modern rock stations in California such as KROQ (Los Angeles), 91X – XETRA-FM (San Diego), and LIVE 105 (San Francisco).

History
TNN Radio, a division of BNG Marketing, launched the program in 2004. This program continues today as the name of the show's live broadcast. It began as a music-only alternative rock program airing on a terrestrial radio station. The program was then broadcast as a live stream  on the American Radio Network in Anaheim, California through mid April 2014. In May 2014, it transitioned to KX935 (93.5 FM), an FM station situated in Laguna Beach, California, which simulcasts both over terrestrial airwaves and live stream.

TNN Radio is also heard through live stream on iHeartRadio, Pandora Radio and Spotify.

Programming
The live broadcast airs on Sundays from 1:00pm to 3:00pm (Pacific Time Zone) on KX935 (KXRN). The program features contemporary modern rock, as well as music from the genesis of the genre. The program also includes music from the new wave, punk rock, grunge, reggae, and ska genres going as far back as the 1970s.

TNN Radio today
Jimmy Alvarez was the first on-air personality brought on board. Alvarez is a music media and publishing veteran. Before landing at TNN RADIO Alvarez had previous on-air engagements at KROQ-FM in Los Angeles, California as well as MARS FM – KDLD (103.1 fm) Santa Monica, California. Also on the broadcast is long-time co-host Randi Lavik who also had previous engagements in Los Angeles with KLOS and Pirate Radio.

Additional On-Air staff includes Liza Kumjian-Smith (aka Leeza London). London features new music from the UK. Before joining TNN, London spent two decades at KROQ as a featured DJ on the Original Rodney on the Roq show with Rodney Bingenheimer as the American in London.

Over the years, TNN has developed a network of contributors that cover and report on events throughout the music landscape. Reviews and photography have been featured in the OC Weekly, Slam Scene Magazine and the Los Angeles Times.

TNN is a media mainstay at events such as the SoCal Hoe Down, Punk Rock Bowling, Sabroso Festival, and One Love Cali Reggae Fest. Past events include Vans Warped Tour, Sunset Strip Music Festival, and It's Not Dead Festival.

In 2013, TNN provided photo content for Rob Zombie's Great American Nightmare. Photo content also used in campaigns for American Authors, Social Distortion and 311.

TNN's video interviews have been featured on official websites for American Authors and The Addicts. Staff photographer Shareef Ellis has had his work featured in the OC Weekly and the Los Angeles Times. Staff photographers have had their work featured by bands such as Awolnation, Blaqk Audio, Cage the Elephant, The Dirty Heads, The Offspring, The Interrupters, Lit, Sublime with Rome, Terri Nunn and Berlin, Oingo Boingo Dance Party, Rob Zombie, Social Distortion, Young the Giant, X the band and 311.

In August 2014, TNN partnered with Skindie Magazine to produce a series of video interviews. Their first collective effort was featured with Pixies. That video was featured throughout all of the band's social media pages. AFI-side project XTRMST, Blaqk Audio as well as 311 utilized staff photos for their social media content.

On August 10 2014, TNN Radio was the first terrestrial radio station to play music by The Interrupters.

In March 2015, executive producer Jimmy Alvarez produced and interviewed blues icon Buddy Guy for the KX935 Morning Show with host Tyler Russell.

In October 2015, Dave McWane of Big D and the Kids table chose TNN RADIO to play their new single "Oi DJ."

In February 2016, Alvarez set and conducted interviews with the KX935 Morning show and TNN RADIO to promote the 2016 MusInk Festival with festival organizers John Reese and Travis Barker. Later that year, they chatted with Warped Tour Organizer, Kevin Lyman. On July 7, 2016, TNN RADIO teamed up with KX935 and was the only radio station to do a live broadcast from Warped Tour (Pomona Fairplex), featuring interviews with several headline bands. Lyman also announced the 2017 Warped Tour schedule and artists in March 2017 on TNN RADIO.

In March 2016, Preiss acted as staff photographer for The Rolling Stones, shot shows in Latin America (Mexico City). In August, 2016 Christina served as staff photographer for Guns N' Roses for their Southern California leg of the tour.

In June 2016, Pressis' photos were used for promotion of the 2016 X Games. In 2017, her photos were also used in an ad campaign for 311. Michelle Alvarez has her photos used for a 2017 ad campaign for OC legends Social Distortion and new-wave icon Adam Ant. Preiss and M. Alvarez had their photo content used for marketing campaigns for the 2017 re-opening of the House of Blues venue in Anaheim, California. M. Alvarez has also had her work featured on Pollstar.

On June 17 2016, Alvarez / TNN RADIO and KX935 published a semi-autobiographical music history piece on the evolution of the ska genre in the OC Weekly. The story chronicled the history and evolution of the genre through the eyes of Alvarez. Featured interviews included ska icons English Beat, The Specials, Selecter, Big D and the Kids Table, Reel Big Fish, Sublime with Rome, The Untouchables and The Interrupters. Contributors included Nate Jackson of the OC Weekly, Disc Jockey Martin Hanlin, Cameron Hallenbeck (International Band Research), (Arlene Semko, Editor).

On July 24 2016, Alvarez and Preiss interviewed Milo Aukerman of the Descendents and discussed their 7th studio album Hyercaffium Spazzinate, and debuted songs off the new album. On July 28 2016, Alvarez published an article on the band in the OC Weekly entitled Beyond the Music, the Story of the Descendents (Arlene Semko, Editor).

In July 2016, Alvarez published two articles in the OC Weekly based on semi-autobiographical events with the Voodoo Glow Skulls, and Johnny Vatos and Oingo Boingo Dance Party.

On August 14 2016, Chris Cheney of The Living End was interviewed, it was Cheney's first U.S. radio interview after leaving music in 2012.

In December 2016, TNN RADIO became a featured podcast on Apple Podcasts.

In September 2018, Alvarez and TNN were sourced in a New York-based Magazine (AtlasObscura) feature on the origins of Ska.

On December 18 2018, TNN RADIO aired its 1000th live broadcast.

Features
Over the years, TNN has engaged in featured video projects, published interviews and concert photography with notable acts such as: AC/DC, The Adicts, AFI, A Flock of Seagulls, The Airborne Toxic Event, Alien Ant Farm, Alkaline Trio, All American Rejects, American Authors, Angels & Airwaves, Anti-Flag, The Aquabats, Asking Alexandria, Awolnation, B52's, Bad Religion, Berlin, Black Uhuru, Bleachers, blink-182, Blondfire, Big D and the Kids Table, Blur, Buckcherry, Buzzcocks, Cage the Elephant, Cherie Currie of The Runaways, The Church, Cold War Kids, The Cult, The Damned, Dead Kennedy's, The Descendents, The Dickies, The Dirty Heads, Dramarama, Dropkick Murphys, Echo & The Bunnymen, The English Beat, The Expendables, Face to Face, Fishbone, Fitz and the Tantrums, Florence + The Machine, Foo Fighters, Green Day, Grouplove, The Growlers, Godsmack, Buddy Guy, The Head and the Heart, Imagine Dragons, Interpol, The Interrupters, Iration, Jimmy Eat World, The Joy Formidable, Kongos, L7, Less Than Jake, Limp Bizkit, Linkin Park, Lit, The Living End, Madness (band), Marilyn Manson, Middle Class Rut, The Mighty Mighty Bosstones, The Misfits, Missing Persons, Missio, Morrissey, The Motels, The Mowglis, Muse, Mustard Plug, MxPx, Neon Trees, New Found Glory, The Mr. T Experience, The Offspring, OK GO, Paul Weller, Pearl Jam, Pennywise, Pepper, Peter Murphy, Pixies, P.O.D., The Psychedelic Furs, Public Image Limited PIL, Puddle of Mudd, Rage Against the Machine, Red Jumpsuit Apparatus, Reel Big Fish, The Rentals, The Reverend Horton Heat, Rise Against, The Rolling Stones, Royal Blood, She Wants Revenge, The Selecter, Shonen Knife, The Slackers, Slightly Stoopid, Social Distortion, Soundgarden, The Specials, Starpool, Stone Temple Pilots, Sublime with Rome, Suburban Legends, Suicidal Tendencies, Sum 41, Supersuckers, The Suicide Machines, SWMRS, Taking Back Sunday, Third Eye Blind, They Might Be Giants, The Toasters, Twenty One Pilots, The Untouchables, The Vandals, Violent Femmes, Voodoo Glow Skulls, The Wailers, Walk the Moon, Weezer, Well Hung Heart, Wolfmother, Xtrmst, X, Youngblood Hawke, Young the Giant, Rob Zombie, Zebrahead, ZZ Ward, The 1975 and 311.

Contributors 

 Jimmy Alvarez - On Air Personality / Executive Producer
 Randi Lavik - On Air Personality / Associate Producer
 Leeza London - On Air Personality / Associate Producer
 Rachael Contreras - On Air Personality / Associate Producer 
 Christina Preiss - Photographer
 James Martinez - On Air Personality
 Jamie Nicole Rocha - Correspondent
 Alaina Pierce – Photographer
 Gil Perez – Photographer
 Fatima Kelly – Photographer
 Michelle Alvarez – Photographer
 Oliver Zavala - Photographer
 Cameron Schuyler – Photographer
 Brittany Woolsey – Correspondent/Photographer
 Priscella Vega – Correspondent/Photographer
 Shareef Ellis – Correspondent/Photographer
 Scarlett A. Lee – Correspondent/Photographer
 Benny "The Breeze" Brezarich – Photographer
 Green Eyed Blonde Photography - Photo content support
 Tiny Toy Land Photography - Photo content support
 King Rock Photography - Photo content support
 Dan Ardis– Technologies
 Amber Crouch– Art & Design
 Katon Guinen– Studio Production
 JTorpedo Media - Video Production
 Chris Graue - Video Production 
 Even Morgan Jones - Video Production 
 Growvision Media - Video Production
 Arlene Semko - Content Editor
 Savannah Just - Art & Design

Former on-air staff
 Lisa Myers aka "Lisa Lately"
 Baron Tenelle aka "Big B"
 Lydia Belton, PhD. aka "Dr. Tranquility"
 Mike Berault (aka Mike B)

References

5. ^ http://www.ibroadcastnetwork.org 
5a.^ http://www.kroq.com
6. ^ http://www.weareamericanauthors.com 
7. ^ http://ocmusicawards.com/oc-music-awards-academy-members/ 
8. ^ http://blogs.ocweekly.com/heardmentality/2015/09/laguna_beachs_kx-fm_935_continues_its_indie_radio_rebellion.php
9. ^ https://instagram.com/tnn_radio_kx935/ 
10. ^ http://www.kx935.com/home
11. ^ https://itunes.apple.com/us/podcast/tnn-radio/id1073986250?mt=2
12. ^ http://www.ocweekly.com/music/the-evolution-of-ska-through-the-eyes-of-an-oc-radio-dj-7267266
13. ^ http://www.ocweekly.com/music/the-descendents-keep-their-punk-lineage-alive-with-new-album-7377566
14. ^ http://www.ocweekly.com/music/how-voodoo-glow-skulls-became-the-godfathers-of-skacore-7381034
15. ^ http://www.ocweekly.com/music/oingo-boingo-dance-party-pays-tribute-to-the-original-bands-undead-spirit-7381028
16. ^ http://www.ocweekly.com/music/ska-bands-raise-money-for-young-fan-with-cancer-at-carterpalooza-tomorrow-7431517
17. ^ http://www.ocweekly.com/music/the-interrupters-are-the-leaders-of-the-4th-wave-ska-movement-7689506
18. ^ http://www.ocweekly.com/music/20-years-after-their-debut-album-slightly-stoopids-career-is-still-sublime-7883787
19. ^ http://www.ocweekly.com/content/printView/7922926
20. ^ http://www.ocweekly.com/music/inside-the-mischievous-minds-of-the-pixies-8048719

External links
 TNN Radio official website
 TNN Radio Facebook page
 TNN Radio Twitter
  TNN Radio Instagram

Internet radio stations in the United States